Callospermophilus is a genus of ground squirrel from North America.

Etymology 
Callospermophilus: gr. καλλος kallos – beauty, from καλος kalos – beautiful; genus Spermophilus F. Cuvier, 1825

Species
The genus contains three species:
 Golden-mantled ground squirrel (C. lateralis)
 Sierra Madre ground squirrel (C. madrensis)
 Cascade golden-mantled ground squirrel (C. saturatus)

References 

 
Rodents of North America
Rodent genera
Taxa named by Clinton Hart Merriam